Zhuravli is a rural locality (a settlement) in Gilyov-Logovskoy Selsoviet, Romanovsky District, Altai Krai, Russia. The population was 26 as of 2013.

Geography 
Zhuravli is located 27 km north of Romanovo (the district's administrative centre) by road. Gilyov-Log is the nearest rural locality.

References 

Rural localities in Romanovsky District, Altai Krai